Slampt (also Slampt Underground Organisation) was a record label set up in Newcastle, England in 1992.

The label is perhaps best known for releasing Kenickie's debut EP. Slampt also released the debut single by The Yummy Fur, a band who later featured Paul Thomson and Alex Huntley a.k.a. Alex Kapranos, who later became the drummer and lead vocalist in Glasgow indie band Franz Ferdinand.

Slampt also released many riot grrrl-related groups such as Pussycat Trash, Golden Starlet, Petty Crime, Sally Skull and International Strike Force. The label (which preferred to call itself an "arts umbrella" rather than a record label as such) was run and "owned" by Rachel Holborow and Pete Dale. Dale and Holborow were also behind many of the "label"'s musical acts such as the minimalist Avocado Baby and the more conventionally "punk" sounding Red Monkey. The latter group survived the collapse of Slampt in 2000 releasing a third LP on Troubleman Unlimited in 2001.

Holborow still makes music in a two-piece group Do The Right Thing whilst Dale is still performing in his long-term outfit Milky Wimpshake.

See also 
 List of record labels

References

External links 
MySpace
Kickstand zine interview
Paper, Scissors, Clock zine interview

British record labels
Record labels established in 1992
Record labels disestablished in 2000
Riot grrrl
Punk record labels